Toon-Us-In was an American-Korean animation studio that has animated episodes of The Ren and Stimpy Show, Captain Simian & the Space Monkeys, Watership Down: Home on the Down, some Peanuts specials, and Love Story of Juliet.  In addition, they animated the main titles for Hey Arnold!.

The Ren and Stimpy show
Episodes of The Ren and Stimpy Show they animated:
 "Chicken in a Drawer" bumper
 Untamed World short after "Hermit Ren"
 Magical Golden Singing Cheeses
 Double Header
 My Shiny Friend
 Ren Needs Help!
 Ol' Blue Nose
 City Hicks
 Ren's Brain
 Who's Stupid Now?
 "Varicose Veins" bumper
 Pen Pals
 "Dog Water" and "Craft-Works Corner: Stimpy Kadoogan" bumpers
 The Last Temptation

Korean animation studios